The 2015–16 Washington Capitals season was the 42nd season for the National Hockey League franchise that was established on June 11, 1974. The season began its regular games on October 10, 2015 against the New Jersey Devils. This was the first of five consecutive Metropolitan Division titles for the Capitals.

Standings

Schedule and results

Pre-season

Regular season

Playoffs

Player statistics
Final stats
Skaters

Goaltenders

†Denotes player spent time with another team before joining the Capitals. Stats reflect time with the Capitals only.
‡Denotes player was traded mid-season. Stats reflect time with the Capitals only.
Bold/italics denotes franchise record.

Player suspensions/fines

Notable achievements

Awards

Milestones

Transactions
The Capitals have been involved in the following transactions during the 2015–16 season.

Trades

Notes
 Buffalo to retain 50% ($1.67 million) of salary as part of trade.

Free agents acquired

Free agents lost

Claimed via waivers

Lost via waivers

Lost via retirement

Player signings

Draft picks

Below are the Washington Capitals' selections at the 2015 NHL Entry Draft, to be held on June 26–27, 2015 at the BB&T Center in Sunrise, Florida.

Draft notes
 The Washington Capitals' second-round pick will go to the Calgary Flames as the result of a trade on March 1, 2015, that sent Curtis Glencross to Washington in exchange for a third-round pick in 2015 and this pick.
  The Montreal Canadiens' second-round pick went to the Washington Capitals as the result of a trade on June 27, 2015, that sent Buffalo's third-round pick in 2015 (62nd overall) and a fourth-round pick in 2015 (113th overall) to New York in exchange for this pick. The Rangers previously acquired this pick as the result of a trade on June 27, 2015, that sent Cam Talbot and a seventh-round pick in 2015 (209th overall) to Edmonton in exchange for Ottawa's third-round pick in 2015 (79th overall), a seventh-round pick in 2015 (184th overall) and this pick.
 The Washington Capitals' third-round pick will go to the Calgary Flames as the result of a trade on March 1, 2015, that sent Curtis Glencross to Washington in exchange for a second-round pick in 2015 and this pick.
 The Washington Capitals' fourth-round pick went to the New York Rangers as the result of a trade on June 27, 2015, that sent Montreal's second-round pick in 2015 (57th overall) to Washington in exchange for and Buffalo's third-round pick in 2015 (62nd overall) and this pick.
 The Washington Capitals' seventh-round pick will go to the Winnipeg Jets as the result of a trade on June 28, 2014, that sent Edward Pasquale and a sixth-round pick in 2014 to Washington in exchange for a sixth-round pick in 2014, Nashville's seventh-round pick in 2014 and this pick.

References

Washington Capitals seasons
Washington Capitals season, 2015-16
Presidents' Trophy seasons
2015 in sports in Washington, D.C.
2016 in sports in Washington, D.C.